The 2022 Monterrey Challenger was a professional tennis tournament played on hard courts. It was the twelfth edition of the tournament which was part of the 2022 ATP Challenger Tour. It took place in Monterrey, Mexico from 7 to 13 March 2022.

Singles main draw entrants

Seeds

 1 Rankings are as of 28 February 2022.

Other entrants
The following players received wildcards into the singles main draw:
  Milledge Cossu
  Ryan Harrison
  Alex Hernández

The following players received entry into the singles main draw using protected rankings:
  Ulises Blanch
  Li Zhe
  Go Soeda
  Rubin Statham

The following players received entry from the qualifying draw:
  William Blumberg
  Strong Kirchheimer
  Aleksandar Kovacevic
  Naoki Nakagawa
  Sho Shimabukuro
  Evan Zhu

Champions

Singles

  Fernando Verdasco def.  Prajnesh Gunneswaran 4–6, 6–3, 7–6(7–3).

Doubles

  Hans Hach Verdugo /  Austin Krajicek def.  Robert Galloway /  John-Patrick Smith 6–0, 6–3.

References

2022 in Mexican tennis
Monterrey Challenger
March 2022 sports events in Mexico